Charlotte Hall Military Academy, located at Charlotte Hall, Maryland, was established as Charlotte Hall School in 1774 by Queen Charlotte to provide for the liberal and pious education of youth to better fit them for the discharge of their duties for the British Empire. It was fully accredited by the Maryland State Department of Education.

The landed estate of the school embraced . The School was non-sectarian and of high moral tone. There were many illustrious graduates, persons of all major professions, clergy and congressmen.

Trustees of the academy, formerly known as Charlotte Hall School, included Roger B. Taney (1777–1864) Supreme Court Justice, George Plater (1735–1792) Governor of Maryland, James Thomas (1785–1845) Governor of Maryland and Joseph Kent (1779–1837) Governor of Maryland.

The School closed its doors in 1976 because of increasing financial problems.  The property is now part of the Charlotte Hall Historic District. It is operated as the Charlotte Hall Veterans Home, a program of the Maryland State Department of Veterans Affairs.

Notable alumni
Edward Bates (1793–1869), United States Attorney General under Abraham Lincoln
Robert Bowie (1750–1818), Governor of Maryland
John Buchanan (1772–1844) Chief Justice of the Maryland Court of Appeals
León Febres Cordero (1931–2008), President of Ecuador
Barnes Compton (1830–1896), congressman and Treasurer from Maryland.
 J. Wilmer Cronin (1896–1982), politician and lawyer from Maryland
William Barton Wade Dent (1806–1855), congressman from Georgia
David Herold (1842–1865), One of the Lincoln Assassination Conspirators
Daniel Jenifer (1791–1855), congressman from Maryland and U.S. Minister to the Austrian Empire
John Thomson Mason (1787–1850)
John T. McKinney (1785–1837), Justice of the Indiana Supreme Court
Thomas Parran Sr. (1860–1955), Maryland congressman, State Delegate and State senator 
Thomas Parran, Surgeon General of the United States from 1936 to 1948
William B. Rochester (1789–1838)
 Admiral Raphael Semmes (1809–1877), captain CSS Alabama
John Stuart Skinner (1788-1851), lawyer, publisher, and editor. Associated with Francis Scott Key.
Sylvester Stallone (born 1946), attended in 1961
Owsley Stanley (1935–2011), Underground LSD cook, sound man and financier for the Grateful Dead
Byron Rimbey Toothman II (born 1950), Mayor Pro Tempore of Barnesfield Subdivision, North Carolina
James Thomas (1785–1845), Governor of Maryland
Richard Thomas (Zarvona) (1833–1875)
George Watterston (1783–1854), first Librarian of Congress
John F. Wood Jr. (born 1936), member Maryland House of Delegates

References

External links
Charlotte Hall School Marker
History of Charlotte Hall Veterans Home

Buildings and structures in St. Mary's County, Maryland
Defunct United States military academies
1774 establishments in Maryland
Charlotte Hall Military Academy alumni
Educational institutions disestablished in 1976
Defunct schools in Maryland
Veterans' homes